Old South Head Road is a road in Sydney which goes from the suburb of Bondi Junction to Watsons Bay. It also passes through Bondi, Bondi Beach, North Bondi, Rose Bay and Vaucluse. It is historically significant because its earliest origins can be traced back to the early days of the colony. The road goes through the local government areas of Waverley Council and the Municipality of Woollahra. It is 6.8 kilometres long.

Description

Old South Head Road passes through predominantly residential areas, with sizeable shopping centres around the intersections with Towns Road and Dover Road. Housing varies from detached homes to blocks of flats and units. The style of housing includes Federation homes, Victorian homes and Art Deco blocks of flats towards Bondi Junction.

History

The colony at Sydney began on 21 January 1788, when the First Fleet arrived in Sydney Harbour and Captain Arthur Phillip went ashore at what is now known as Camp Cove. The settlement itself was set up in Sydney Cove, at the spot now known as Circular Quay. One of the reasons for the choice of that location was the desire to be safely out of range of hostile artillery. The colony needed to keep watch on the seas for potentially hostile ships or the Second Fleet, which meant that South Head became important as an observation post.  The outer edge of South Head became a signal station from which ships could be seen; their approach could then be signalled with flags. The ships could then be met by pilots who were camped at Camp Cove (so named for that reason).

A proper signal station was established in 1790; it was supplied by boat until a bridle trail was created along the ridge to South Head. Construction of a road followed and it was completed in 1811.  A lighthouse was built just south of the signal station in 1816-18, to a design by Francis Greenway, the first notable architect in the colony.  A semaphore system replaced flags at the signal station in the 1840s and the present building was constructed to a design by Colonial Architect Mortimer Lewis. It has been in continuous use since then and is now heritage-listed. In 1858, the first telegraph line in New South Wales was used to connect the signal station with the Royal Exchange in Bridge Street.

Points of interest
(RNE) indicates that the structure or site is listed on the Register of the National Estate.

 St Peter's Anglican Church, Watsons bay, designed by Edmund Blacket and built in 1864 (RNE)
 Our Lady Star of the Sea Catholic Church, Watsons Bay, built 1909-1910, with later additions in 1929, 1940 and 1966 (RNE)
 Scout hall, Watsons Bay, formerly a school, designed by George Mansfield and built in 1876 (RNE)
 A former school residence, next to the scout hall, designed by George Mansfield and built by George Murray circa 1876 (RNE)
 Sandstone obelisk, Robertson Park (not situated in Old South Head Road), commemorating building of Old South Head Road in 1811 (RNE)
 Signal Station, still functional and run by Transport for NSW (RNE)

 Signal Hill Battery is situated between Gap Park and Signal Station. The site includes two gun emplacements that are connected to underground bunker complexes.
 Macquarie Lighthouse: the present lighthouse is a replica of Greenway's original building, which was demolished because it was in bad repair. The current building was built in 1883 to a design by James Barnet. The group also includes the keeper's cottage and an earlier cottage by Greenway (RNE)
 Gap Park is situated between Old South Head Road and the cliff, and leads to the Gap, a notorious suicide spot
 Coastal Cliff Walk is a walking trail that goes from Clarke Street to South head.
 Christison Park is situated south of Macquarie Lighthouse
 South Head Cemetery. Situated at the juncture of Old South Head Road and New South Head Road, this cemetery was established to service the growing Vaucluse area. Its first interment was in 1869. Well-known inhabitants include Sir John Robertson, the Packer family, the Fairfax family, Juanita Nielsen and Sir Walter Edward Davidson.
 Former Methodist Church, built 1924, currently houses Magnolia Healing Centre. It is located at the corner of Old South Head Road and Dover Road, Rose Bay, and is supported by Bondi Beach Chapel by the Sea and Rose Bay/Vaucluse Uniting Church.
 Royal Sydney Golf Course is situated between Old South Head Road and New South Head Road, Rose Bay.
 Architecture: examples of Art Deco blocks of flats, single-storey Federation homes and Victorian-style cottages can be seen between Victoria Road and Bondi Road.
 A two-storey Victorian terrace home near Bondi Road now houses the Mahasiddha Kadampa Buddhist Centre, which holds meditation courses and drop-in classes.

See also

References

External links
 Magnolia Healing Centre

Streets in Sydney
Vaucluse, New South Wales